Anatoly Lutikov (5 February 1933 in Leningrad – 23 October 1989 in Tiraspol) was a Russian chess player. He was awarded the International Master title in 1967 and the Grandmaster title in 1974. He won the Moldovan championship six times (1963, 1964, 1965, 1966, 1968, 1977). He came third in the USSR Chess Championship 1968/69, finished second behind Boris Spassky at Wijk aan Zee 1967, was first at Dubna 1971, tied for first at Leipzig 1973 and came first at Albena 1976. According to Bill Wall, Lutikov committed suicide in 1989.

References

 Sosonko, Genna (2003), The Reliable Past, New in Chess. .

External links

1933 births
1989 deaths
Chess grandmasters
Soviet chess players
20th-century chess players